Flower Grandpa Investigation Unit is a 2014 South Korean television series starring Lee Soon-jae, Byun Hee-bong, Jang Gwang and Kim Hee-chul. It aired on tvN from May 9 to July 25, 2014 on Fridays at 21:50 for 12 episodes.

Plot
The lives of four detectives in their twenties are changed forever when after an experiment gone awry, three of them rapidly age overnight and find themselves in the bodies of old men in their seventies (only one, Park Jung-woo, emerges unscathed and stays young). As his suddenly much older colleagues comically struggle to deal with their new and unusual predicament, Jung-woo shares in their hardships, joining them in their mission to find a way to reclaim their lost youth. Meanwhile, the team also continues to solve crimes, while the "grandpas" work at a delivery service as their cover.

Cast

Main characters
Lee Soon-jae as Lee Joon-hyuk (70s)
Choi Jin-hyuk as Lee Joon-hyuk (29)
Shin Dong-woo as teenage Lee Joon-hyuk
The brains of the operation. He has a photographic memory and never forgets a single detail, and is widely known in the precinct for being cold-hearted and selfish, who probably wouldn't even bleed if you pricked his finger. But one day he works a strange case, and wakes up having aged fifty years overnight. Suddenly he can't remember even the simplest details because he's battling senility. And he has to watch helplessly as his fiancée questions why her boyfriend just vanished into thin air three months before their wedding.

Kim Hee-chul as Park Jung-woo (29)
The precinct's golden boy, the only son of the chief of police who was born with a silver spoon in his mouth. He's the only one who escapes the aging spell.

Byun Hee-bong as Han Won-bin (70s)
Park Min-woo as Han Won-bin (29)
The Casanova of the group, who pretty much skates by in life with his looks and charm. But when he wakes up as an old man, he finds his face covered in wrinkles and doesn't know how to function when he can't get anyone — even ajummas — to look his way.

Jang Gwang as Jeon Kang-seok (70s)
Park Doo-shik as Jeon Kang-seok (28)
The youngest of the group at 28, he's a former national boxer. Of course in an elderly body, he finds that he can't kick anything without throwing out his back.

Supporting characters
Lee Cho-hee as Jung Eun-ji, female detective
Kim Eung-soo as Kim Young-chul, head of investigation unit
Park Eun-ji as Han Yoo-ra, Joon-hyuk's fiancée
Kim Byung-se as Choi Jae-wook, deputy department head
Shin Kwi-shik as Park Jin-woo, police commissioner
Kim Sun-young as Joon-hyuk's mother
Kim Byung-choon as Joon-hyuk's father
Seo Ye-hwa as Lee Soo-jung, Joon-hyuk's younger sister
Ha Gyu-won as Lee Ji-hyun
Son Young-soon as Choi Jae-wook's wife
Park Hyo-joo as Jeon Hye-jin
Kwon Eun-soo as Guem Mae-sil	
Lee Ki-woo as Park Tae-min
Lee Seung-ho as Jung Myung-ho
Lee Tae-hyung as Charlie Jung

Guest appearances
Sam Hammington as Russian robber (ep 1)
Kwon Mina as Han Seol-hee (ep 3, 6)
Lee Yong-nyeo as Han Seol-hee's maid (ep 3)
Kim Jin-soo as Michael Kim (ep 4)
Heo Jae-ho as Song Jin-chul (ep 4)
Yoo Soo-jeong as Oh Jin-hee (ep 4)
Kwon Min-joong as Sous chef (ep 4)
Choi Young-shin as Jo-eun (ep 5)
Jung Jin as Manager Jung (ep 5)
Ahn Sung-hoon as Jung-hoon (ep 5)
Jung In-young as Kang So-ri (ep 6)
Heo Jin as Kang So-ri's mother (ep 6)
Jang Se-hyun as Fortuneteller (ep 6)
Lee Chul-min as Loan shark boss (ep 6)
Choi Ji-ho as Kang So-ri's manager (ep 6)
Choi Dong-yip as Film director (ep 6)
Kim Do-yeon as Hair salon employee (ep 6, 8)
Byung Hun as Uhm Si-woo (ep 7)
Park Sung-joon as Kim Min-woo (ep 7)
Na Chang-yup as Choi Min-ho (ep 7)
Park Hyo-bin as Kim Jae-hee (ep 7)
Woo Jin-hee as Kwon Bo-mi (ep 7)
Han Je-in as Lee Eun-joo (ep 7)
Lee Jae-wook as Flasher Park Young-gil (ep 7)
Kim Dong-kyun as Waxing employee (ep 7)
Jung Min-sung as School security guard (ep 7)
Woo Sang-jeon as Jo Joong-go (ep 8)
Oh Jung-tae as Joo Tae-baek (ep 8)
Kim Choo-wol as Literature expert (ep 10)
Lee Sang-hong as Kim Joong-eun (ep 11)
Min Ji-won as Won-bin's girlfriend (ep 12)

Ratings

International broadcast
  Philippines - TV5 - June 2015

References

External links
Flower Grandpa Investigation Unit official tvN website 

2014 South Korean television series debuts
2014 South Korean television series endings
Korean-language television shows
TVN (South Korean TV channel) television dramas
South Korean crime television series
South Korean comedy television series